Gussage is a series of three villages in north Dorset, England, situated along the Gussage Stream, a tributary of the River Allen on Cranborne Chase,  north east of Blandford Forum and  north of Wimborne.  The stream runs through all three parishes: Gussage All Saints, population 192, Gussage St Michael, pop. 219 (in 2001) and Gussage St Andrew, population unknown, but smaller than the other two villages.

External links 
 Census data

Villages in Dorset